The 4th Army Aviation Regiment "Altair" is an Italian Army regiment based at Bolzano Airport in South Tyrol. The regiment is part of the army aviation and assigned to the Army Aviation Brigade. Formed in 1976 as support unit of the IV Alpine Army Corps the regiment is since then responsible for helicopter operations in the Italian Alps and constitutes, together with the 2nd Army Aviation Regiment "Sirio", the Italian Army's general support aviation capability.

History 
In January 1958 the following aviation units were formed to support the IV Army Corps, which was responsible for the defense of the Alps:

 Light Aircraft Section, at Belluno Airport for the Alpine Brigade "Cadore"
 Light Aircraft Section, at Venaria Reale Airport for the Alpine Brigade "Taurinense"
 Light Aircraft Section, at Bolzano Airport for the IV Army Corps

In September 1958 the II Helicopters Unit was formed at Bolzano Airport, which was also home of the Light Aircraft Section of the Regiment "Savoia Cavalleria" (3rd). The Savoia Cavalleria's Light Aircraft Section had been formed in spring 1956 at the Casale Monferrato Airport and had moved to Bolzano Airport in 1957, while the Savoia Cavalleria moved from Casale Monferrato to Meran.

In March 1963 the light aircraft sections of the IV Army Corps and Savoia Cavalleria merged to form the IV Light Aviation Unit. The same month the II Helicopters Unit was renumbered as IV Helicopters Unit. Both units were assigned to the IV Army Corps and based at Bolzano Airport. In February 1964 the light aviation sections of the two alpine brigades Cadore and Taurinense were expanded to light aviation units. The other three brigades of the corps also formed light aviation units: the Alpine Brigade "Orobica" at Bolzano Airport, the Alpine Brigade "Tridentina" at Toblach Airport, and the Alpine Brigade "Julia" at Campoformido Airport.

In 1969 the IV Helicopters Unit was renamed IV General Use Helicopters Unit and on 1 August 1971 the Alpine Military School in Aosta formed another Light Aviation Unit at Pollein Airport.

Formation 
During the 1975 Army reform the army reorganized its aviation units and for the first time created aviation units above battalion level. On 20 January 1976 the 4th Army Light Aviation Grouping "Altair" was formed at Bolzano Airport and took command of the following aviation units of the IV Alpine Army Corps:

 IV Light Aviation Unit, which was renamed: 24th Army Light Aviation Squadrons Group "Orione"
 IV General Use Helicopters Unit, which was renamed: 54th Multirole Helicopters Squadrons Group "Cefeo"
 Light Aviation Unit "Cadore" and Light Aviation Unit "Taurinense", which were merged to form the 44th Reconnaissance Helicopters Squadrons Group "Fenice"

On 1 June 1976 the Light Aviation Unit at Pollein Airport was renamed 545th Multirole Helicopters Squadron and assigned to the 54th Multirole Helicopters Squadrons Group "Cefeo". The remaining aviation units of the corps were disbanded and their personnel and materiel integrated into the 4th Army Light Aviation Grouping "Altair" respectively the 5th Army Light Aviation Grouping "Rigel".

From 1 June 1976 the grouping was organized as follows:

  4th Army Light Aviation Grouping "Altair", at Bolzano Airport
 24th Army Light Aviation Squadrons Group "Orione", at Bolzano Airport
 Command and Services Squadron
 241st Light Aircraft Squadron (SM.1019A planes)
 440th Reconnaissance Helicopters Squadron (AB 206 helicopters)
 44th Reconnaissance Helicopters Squadrons Group "Fenice", at Belluno Airport
 Command and Services Squadron
 441st Reconnaissance Helicopters Squadron (AB 206 helicopters)
 442nd Reconnaissance Helicopters Squadron, detached to Venaria Reale Airport (AB 206 helicopters)
 54th Multirole Helicopters Squadrons Group "Cefeo", at Bolzano Airport
 Command and Services Squadron
 541st Multirole Helicopters Squadron (AB 204B/205 helicopters)
 542nd Multirole Helicopters Squadron (AB 204B/205 helicopters)
 543rd Multirole Helicopters Squadron (AB 204B/205 helicopters)
 544th Multirole Helicopters Squadron, detached to Belluno Airport (AB 204B/205 helicopters)
 545th Multirole Helicopters Squadron, detached to Pollein Heliport (AB 204B/205 helicopters)

Naming 
Since the 1975 army reform Italian army aviation units are named for celestial objects: groupings, and later regiments, are numbered with a single digit and named for stars in the 88 modern constellationss. Accordingly, an army aviation regiment's coat of arms highlights the name-giving star within its constellation. Squadron groups were numbered with two digits and named for constellations, or planets of the Solar System. The 4th Army Light Aviation Grouping was named for Altair the brightest star in the Aquila constellation. When the army raised army aviation support regiments in 1996 they were named in relation to the regiment they supported, and therefore the 4th Altair's support regiment was named 3rd Army Aviation Support Regiment "Aquila".

On 14 March 1977 the grouping was granted its flag by decree 173 of the President of the Italian Republic Giovanni Leone. Since then one Bronze Medal of Army Valour, five Silver Medals of Civil Valour, one Silver Cross of Army Merit, and one Bronze Medal of Red Cross Merit have been awarded to the regiment and attached to its flag.

Recent times 
On 1 September 1985 the grouping formed the 34th Army Light Aviation Squadrons Group "Toro" at Venaria Reale Airport, which took command of the 442nd Reconnaissance Helicopters Squadron at Venaria Reale Airport and the 545th Multirole Helicopters Squadron at Pollein Heliport. On the same date the 544th Multirole Helicopters Squadron at Belluno Airport passed from the 54th Multirole Helicopters Squadrons Group "Cefeo" to the 44th Reconnaissance Helicopters Squadrons Group "Fenice", which was renamed on that date 44th Army Light Aviation Squadrons Group "Fenice".

On 1 October 1989 the 241st Light Aircraft Squadron was disbanded and the 440th Reconnaissance Helicopters Squadron transferred from the 24th Army Light Aviation Squadrons Group "Orione" to the 54th "Cefeo". On the same date the 24th Army Light Aviation Squadrons Group "Orione" was reorganized as 24th Command and Support Group. In 1990 the 54th Multirole Helicopters Squadrons Group "Cefeo" was renamed 54th Army Light Aviation Squadrons Group "Cefeo". On 1 September 1991 the 545th Multirole Helicopters Squadron moved from Pollein Heliport to Venaria Reale Airport. On 5 October 1991 the 4th Army Light Aviation Grouping "Altair" was renamed 4th Army Light Aviation Regiment "Altair". The regiment was now organized as follows:

  4th Army Light Aviation Regiment "Altair", at Bolzano Airport
 24th Command and Support Group "Orione", at Bolzano Airport
 Command and Services Squadron
 Maintenance Squadron
 34th Army Light Aviation Squadrons Group "Toro", at Venaria Reale Airport
 Command and Services Squadron
 442nd Reconnaissance Helicopters Squadron (AB 206 helicopters)
 545th Multirole Helicopters Squadron (AB 204B/205 helicopters)
 44th Army Light Aviation Squadrons Group "Fenice", at Belluno Airport
 Command and Services Squadron
 441st Reconnaissance Helicopters Squadron (AB 206 helicopters)
 544th Multirole Helicopters Squadron (AB 204B/205 helicopters)
 54th Army Light Aviation Squadrons Group "Cefeo", at Bolzano Airport
 440th Reconnaissance Helicopters Squadron (AB 206 helicopters)
 541st Multirole Helicopters Squadron (AB 204B/205 helicopters)
 542nd Multirole Helicopters Squadron (AB 204B/205 helicopters)
 543rd Multirole Helicopters Squadron (AB 204B/205 helicopters)

On 12 June 1993 the 4th Army Light Aviation Regiment "Altair" was renamed 4th Army Aviation Regiment "Altair". On 31 December 1993 the 24th Command and Support Group was disbanded. On 5 July 1996 the 44th Army Aviation Squadrons Group "Fenice" was transferred from the Altair to the 7th Attack Helicopters Regiment "Vega". On 20 September 1998 the 542nd and 543rd multirole helicopters squadrons are disbanded. In 2001 the regiment entered the Air Cavalry Grouping, which on 1 March 2006 became the Army Aviation Brigade. In February 2016 the regiment retires its last AB 206 helicopters and the 34th Army Aviation Squadrons Group "Toro" is reduced to 34th Detachment "Toro".

Current Structure 

As of 2022 the 4th Army Aviation Regiment "Altair" consists of:

  4th Army Aviation Regiment "Altair", at Bolzano Airport
 Command and Logistic Support Squadron, at Bolzano Airport
 34th Detachment "Toro", at Venaria Reale Airport
 Command and Logistic Support Squadron
 545th Combat Support Helicopters Squadron
 Maintenance Squadron
 54th Squadrons Group "Cefeo", at Bolzano Airport
 440th Combat Support Helicopters Squadron
 541st Combat Support Helicopters Squadron
 Maintenance Squadron, at Bolzano Airport

Equipment 
The regiment is equipped with AB 205A helicopters, which the Army plans to replace with AW169MA helicopters from 2023.

See also 
 Army Aviation

External links
Italian Army Website: 4° Reggimento Aviazione dell'Esercito "Altair"

References

Army Aviation Regiments of Italy